Bedel's Regiment was first raised as a single company of rangers in Coos, New Hampshire on May 26, 1775 under the command of Timothy Bedel for the protection of northern New Hampshire during the early days of the American Revolutionary War. Between July 1775 and January 1776 eight more companies of rangers were recruited from the frontiermen of northern New Hampshire as the regiment joined the Continental Army and took part in the Siege of Fort St. Jean and the Battle of The Cedars during the Invasion of Canada. Most of the regiment was captured at The Cedars but were exchanged for British soldiers captured during the Canadian campaign eight days later. With the ending of the enlistments of the soldiers the regiment was disbanded on January 1, 1777 at Coos, New Hampshire.

Sources

External links 

Bibliography of the Continental Army in New Hampshire compiled by the United States Army Center of Military History
Ranger Service  compiled by Albert S. Batchellor of the New Hampshire Society of Sons of the American Revolution 1900.

Military units and formations established in 1775
Coös County, New Hampshire
New Hampshire regiments of the Continental Army